Isaac Moor McGorian (born 19 October 1901) was an English professional footballer who played as a wing half for Sunderland.

References

1901 births
People from the City of Sunderland
Footballers from Tyne and Wear
English footballers
Association football wing halves
Silksworth Colliery F.C. players
Sunderland A.F.C. players
Notts County F.C. players
Carlisle United F.C. players
Shotton Colliery Welfare F.C. players
Thurnscoe Victoria F.C. players
English Football League players
Year of death missing